Dirt jumping is the practice of riding bikes over jumps made of dirt or soil and becoming airborne. Dirt Jumping evolved alongside BMX racing and is similar to BMX or mountain bike racing in that the rider jumps off of mounds of dirt, usually performing a midair trick in between. It differs in that the jumps are usually much larger and designed to lift the rider higher into the air. Additionally, the goal is not to complete the course with the fastest time, but rather to perform the tricks with the style. Dirt jumping can be performed on BMX bikes or specialized mountain bikes known simply as "dirt jumpers".

Dirt jumping bikes

Dirt jumping uses a specific kind of bike. BMX, for instance, has a range of bikes built for this activity. One of its key differences from general purpose bikes is the fit. There is only one standard BMX dirt jumping bike frame, which is meant to fit all riders, young and old. These bicycles tend to have a longer top tube than a street BMX bike and are often more robustly built to withstand the poundings from the jumps. They will rarely have pegs fitted. Traditionally, DJ (dirt jump) bikes ran only a rear v-brake but disc brakes are becoming more common. DJ tires are treaded - the heaviest treads of all the BMX bikes - as opposed to the slicks and semi-slicks used for park riding. The wheel size is mostly 26-inch.

Some riders prefer large, padded seats for in-flight tricks while others do not find seat size an issue. The gear ratio is generally around 44:16, 36:13, 33:12, and 30:11, although using smaller gearings such as 25:9, known as 'micro gearing', has become popular.

There is also the so-called hybrid BMX/Jump bike, which is a scaled-up BMX with 24-inch wheels. Strong alloy rims and lightweightframe. Suited to bigger jumps or more challenging competition courses. Other types of dirt jumping bikes include:

Freestyle Motocross (FMX, Moto-X) of various sizes & engine sizes.
 Dirt Jump/Freestyle mountain bikes look similar to mountain bikes but usually have a rigid frame and a lower stand-over height, in order to keep the seat out of the way while performing tricks. Some high end DJ frames also have short travel rear suspension, sometimes with bottom-bracket-concentric pivots to allow singlespeed use. The wheels are usually more robust than a cross country mountain bike's and the same for the frame.
Mountain bikes - 24- or 26-inch wheels and either rigid forks or forks with short front end suspension (usually 80–100 mm travel, but can be up to 203 mm depending on the type of the bicycle). A firm suspension is desirable for dirt jumping.

A mountain bike built for dirt jumping tends to have a smaller frame than what is used for other disciplines. Running singlespeed with one brake is very common. using single or dual disc brakes has replaced the use of only one rear V-brake. In general, a mountain bike dedicated to dirt jumping will have 24- or 26-inch wheels, a gear ratio of approximately 60 gear inches (~36:15 on a 24-inch rear wheel or ~36:16 on a 26-inch rear wheel) and rigid or 80-100mm travel forks. An 'all-round' bike used for dirt jumping will more likely have 26-inch wheels, a 25-36 tooth chainring with a wide-ratio cassette and a short- to mid-travel fork. Mountain bike dirt jumpers are usually split on the basis of wheel size because the wheel size dictates the shape of the takeoff to an extent.

A 20-inch BMX bike for dirt generally has a 48-spoke rear rim and a 36-spoke front to prevent rim collapse in the case of casing a jump. The frame is a little bit longer to aid in stability and to spread the load of heavy lands. Most of these "micro geared" bikes run 85 to 100 psi tires, and tires are usually threaded and made with kevlar bead to prevent pressure flats and tears.

Types of jumps
 

Double the most common form of dirt jumps. This consists of two separate earthworks, one acting as a takeoff (lip), and the other as a landing. Also known as a "gap" jump. They can be "Step-Ups", where the jump's up ramp is lower than the down ramp and the rider loses speed, or "Step-Downs", where the jump's down ramp is lower than the up ramp, meaning that they gain speed.
Tabletops are more common among those new to the sport, they are a single earthwork with a takeoff at one end, and a landing at the other, with a flat 'table' on the top. These are favoured by new riders because when the rider comes up short they can still easily ride out of it.
Ski Jumps consist of just a takeoff, they're usually longer and flatter than other jumps, and tend to be situated on downhills, so the slope of the hill can serve as a landing. They're used mostly in competitions on jump length.
Rollers are small tabletops that give you extra speed by 'pumping' the jump. They are usually found at the beginning of a trail.
Step ups are ramps just before inclines. They enable riders to jump from the top of the incline to a raised landing.
Whoops/Rhythms a series of three or more small rounded ramps close together, enabling riders to 'manual' over them.
Spine is a steep dirt jump with a take-off and a landing, but no table or gap, made to get higher air without distance.
Berm a curved embankment that comes out of the ground. Mostly used on sharp turns, berms assist riders by giving them the ability to bank sharply, and make a sharper turn. Mainly used on downhill trails, but can also be present alongside dirt jumps to help riders avoid hitting trees. They are also used to maintain riders' speed without having to brake on turns. Some trails consist of jumps that lead into berms.
Hip Jumps consist of a jump with the landing 45 - 90 degrees left or right of the ramp, enabling transfers.
Triple Jumps consist of a take off, unused earthwork and a landing
 360 Berms consist of a large berm that goes just shy of 360 degrees, and is either jumped into and/or out of.

Types of Acrobatics

See also
Cycling
BMX bike
Freestyle BMX
Single track (mountain biking)
Bunny hop (cycling)
Glossary of cycling

References

External links

Cycle sport
Articles containing video clips
Mountain biking
BMX